Brookwell McNamara Entertainment, Inc. is a production company formed by David Brookwell and Sean McNamara. It has made television shows for Disney Channel, Disney XD, CBS, Cartoon Network, The N, and Nickelodeon. It is one of the largest out-sourced vendors of production for Disney Channel and Nickelodeon, among others.

Films
 Casper: A Spirited Beginning (1997)
 3 Ninjas: High Noon at Mega Mountain (1998)
 Casper Meets Wendy (1998)
 Treehouse Hostage (1999)
 Race to Space (2001)
 The Even Stevens Movie (2003)
 Raise Your Voice (2004)
 The Cutting Edge: Going for the Gold (2006)
 McKids Adventures: Get Up and Go with Ronald (2006)
 McKids Adventures: Treasure Hunt with Ronald (2006)
 Legally Blondes (2009)
 Soul Surfer (2011)
 Baby Geniuses and the Mystery of the Crown Jewels (2013)
 Field of Lost Shoes (2014)
 Baby Geniuses and the Treasures of Egypt (2014)
 Loopers: The Caddie's Long Walk (2019)
 Mighty Oak (2020)
 The King's Daughter (2022)

Television series
Even Stevens (2000–03)
That's So Raven (2003–06)
Beyond the Break (2006–09)
Just for Kicks (2006)
Dance Revolution (2006–07)
Cake (2006)
Out of Jimmy's Head (2007–08)

References

External links
 Brookwell McNamara Entertainment

 
Television production companies of the United States
Film production companies of the United States